Zakim Shah may refer to:
Zakim Shah (Afghan election official), is the chairman or director of Afghanistan's Joint Election Management Board
Zakim Shah (Guantanamo captive 898), captured in December 2002, based on a false denunciation